Charadrius  is a genus of plovers, a group of wading birds. The genus name Charadrius is a Late Latin word for a yellowish bird mentioned in the fourth-century Vulgate.
They are found throughout the world.

Many Charadrius species are characterised by breast bands or collars. These can be (in the adult) complete bands (ringed, semipalmated, little ringed, long-billed), double or triple bands (killdeer, three-banded, Forbes', two-banded, double-banded) or partial collars (Kentish, piping, snowy, Malaysian, Javan, red-capped, puna).

They have relatively short bills and feed mainly on insects, worms or other invertebrates, depending on habitat, which are obtained by a run-and-pause technique, rather than the steady probing of some other wader groups. They hunt by sight, rather than by feel as do longer-billed waders like snipe.

Species of the genus Aegialites (or Aegialitis) are now subsumed within Charadrius.

Taxonomy
The genus Charadrius was introduced in 1758 by the Swedish naturalist Carl Linnaeus in 1758 in the tenth edition of his Systema Naturae. The name had been used (as Charadrios sive Hiaticula) by the Italian naturalist Ulisse Aldrovandi in 1603 for the common ringed plover. The word is Late Latin and is mentioned in the Vulgate Bible. It derives from the Ancient Greek χαραδριος/kharadrios, an unidentified plain-coloured nocturnal bird that was found in ravines and river valleys (from kharadra, "ravine"). The type species is the common ringed plover.

Species
The genus contains 32 species.
 New Zealand dotterel, red-breasted plover or New Zealand plover, Charadrius obscurus
 Common ringed plover, Charadrius hiaticula
 Semipalmated plover, Charadrius semipalmatus
 Long-billed plover, Charadrius placidus
 Little ringed plover, Charadrius dubius
 Wilson's plover, Charadrius wilsonia
 Killdeer, Charadrius vociferus
 Piping plover, Charadrius melodus
 Madagascar plover, Charadrius thoracicus
 Kittlitz's plover, Charadrius pecuarius
 Saint Helena plover, Charadrius sanctaehelenae
 Three-banded plover, Charadrius tricollaris
 Forbes's plover, Charadrius forbesi
 Kentish plover, Charadrius alexandrinus
 White-faced plover, Charadrius dealbatus
 Snowy plover, Charadrius nivosus
 Javan plover, Charadrius javanicus
 White-fronted plover, Charadrius marginatus
 Red-capped plover, Charadrius ruficapillus
 Malaysian plover, Charadrius peronii
 Chestnut-banded plover, Charadrius pallidus
 Collared plover, Charadrius collaris
 Puna plover, Charadrius alticola
 Double-banded plover or banded dotterel (New Zealand), Charadrius bicinctus
 Two-banded plover, Charadrius falklandicus
 Lesser sand plover, Charadrius mongolus
 Greater sand plover, Charadrius leschenaultii
 Caspian plover, Charadrius asiaticus
 Oriental plover, Charadrius veredus
 Eurasian dotterel, Charadrius morinellus
 Rufous-chested plover, Charadrius modestus
 Mountain plover, Charadrius montanus
In December 2020, it was described in a paper that the Kentish plover subspecies C.a.seebohmi may be a new species, the Hanuman plover.

Gallery

Notes

References

 
Bird genera